The Rachael Heyhoe Flint Trophy is an English women's cricket domestic competition, named after former England captain Rachael Heyhoe Flint, Baroness Heyhoe-Flint, who died in 2017. The first edition of the tournament took place during August and September 2020, with the Southern Vipers beating the Northern Diamonds in the final. Initially started as a one-off tournament, in February 2021 the England and Wales Cricket Board (ECB) announced it would return for the 2021 season as a permanent part of the women's domestic structure in England, alongside the Charlotte Edwards Cup.

History
In 2018, the England and Wales Cricket Board (ECB) announced the launch of The Hundred in 2020, which would supersede the existing premier women's cricket tournament, the Women's Cricket Super League. To go alongside The Hundred, the ECB announced a plan to launch a new 'regional elite domestic structure for women's cricket', which would include the awarding of 40 new full-time professional contracts for non-England players.  

These plans were put on hold due to the COVID-19 pandemic, but the Rachael Heyhoe Flint Trophy was eventually scheduled to begin in August 2020, with six new teams competing, alongside two teams carried over from the WCSL, Western Storm and Southern Vipers. The trophy was named after former England player Rachael Heyhoe Flint, and was intended to be a one-off, in light of the pandemic. 

Southern Vipers were the inaugural champions of the tournament, beating Northern Diamonds in the final.

In February 2021, the ECB announced that the Rachael Heyhoe Flint Trophy would continue for the following season, alongside a new Regional T20 competition, with a slightly altered format. Southern Vipers and Northern Diamonds again reached the final, and Southern Vipers were again victorious, claiming their second title. In 2022, the Vipers and Diamonds once again reached the final, but this time the Northern Diamonds won by two runs, claiming their first title. 

Ahead of the 2023 season, it was announced that the tournament was expanding, with teams now playing each other team home and away.

Teams

The teams for the Rachael Heyhoe Flint Trophy are as follows:

Competition format
In the 2020 season, the teams were separated into a North and South Group, and each team played six group stage matches, in a double round-robin format. The two group winners played each other in the competition's final. In the following two seasons, the eight teams play each other once in a round-robin format. The second and third placed teams compete in a playoff, the winner of which plays in the final against the first placed team. In 2023, teams will play each other twice, home and away, in a double round-robin format.

Teams receive 4 points for a win. A bonus point is given where the winning team's run rate is 1.25 or greater times that of the opposition. In case of a tie in the standings, the following tiebreakers are applied in order: highest net run rate, team that scored the most points in matches involving the tied parties, better bowling strike rate, drawing of lots.

Tournament results

References

 
Women's cricket competitions in England
English domestic cricket competitions
2020 establishments in England
Women's sports leagues in England
Sports leagues established in 2020